Conus aplustre, common name the black-end cone, is a species of sea snail, a marine gastropod mollusk in the family Conidae, the cone snails and their allies.

Like all species within the genus Conus, these snails are predatory and venomous. They are capable of "stinging" humans, therefore live ones should be handled carefully or not at all.

Description
The size of the shell varies between 19 mm and 27 mm. The shell is rather stoutly turbinated, smooth, thin, somewhat inflated, and striate towards the base. Its color is yellowish white, with irregular yellowish brown or ash faint bands, and lines of white and chestnut articulations. The spire is depressed. The apex is pointed.

Distribution
This marine species is endemic to Australia and occurs off New South Wales and Queensland.

References

 Reeve, L.A. 1843. Descriptions of new species of shells figured in the 'Conchologia Iconica'. Proceedings of the Zoological Society of London 11: 169–197 
 Adams, A. 1854. Descriptions of new species of the Genus Conus, from the collection of Hugh Cuming, Esq. Proceedings of the Zoological Society of London 1853(21): 116–119
 Brazier, J. 1870. Descriptions of three new species of marine shells from the Australian coast. Proceedings of the Zoological Society of London (1): 108–109
 Hedley, C. 1913. Studies of Australian Mollusca. Part XI. Proceedings of the Linnean Society of New South Wales 38: 258–339
 Wilson, B.R. & Gillett, K. 1971. Australian Shells: illustrating and describing 600 species of marine gastropods found in Australian waters. Sydney : Reed Books 168 pp.
 Wilson, B. (1994) Australian marine shells. Prosobranch gastropods. Vol. 2 Neogastropods. Odyssey Publishing, Kallaroo, Western Australia, 370 pp.
 Röckel, D., Korn, W. & Kohn, A.J. 1995. Manual of the Living Conidae. Volume 1: Indo-Pacific Region. Wiesbaden : Hemmen 517 pp.
 Puillandre N., Duda T.F., Meyer C., Olivera B.M. & Bouchet P. (2015). One, four or 100 genera? A new classification of the cone snails. Journal of Molluscan Studies. 81: 1–23

External links
 The Conus Biodiversity website
 Cone Shells – Knights of the Sea
 

aplustre
Gastropods of Australia
Gastropods described in 1843